Poupou may refer to:

Raymond Poulidor, a French racing cyclist
Poupou (architecture), a wall carving in a Māori wharenui

Nicknames
Nicknames in cycling